True North (foaled March 30, 1966 in Virginia) was an American Thoroughbred racehorse owned by Sonny Whitney and trained by George Poole.

Background
True North was bred by Taylor Hardin's Newstead Farm in Upperville, Virginia. He was the son of the 20th century's greatest sire, Northern Dancer, and out of the mare Hill Rose, a daughter of Rosemont and Miss Disco who was also the dam of the very influential National Champion and Hall of Fame sire Bold Ruler.

Racing career
True North was best known for winning the then richest race in Florida, the 1971 Widener Handicap at Hialeah Park Race Track.

Pedigree

References

1966 racehorse births
Thoroughbred family 8-d
Racehorses bred in Virginia
Racehorses trained in the United States
Whitney racehorses